Carl Ludwig   was a Private in the Union Army, received the Medal of Honor, on July 30, 1896, for his brave and gallant action at the Second Battle of Petersburg, Virginia during the American Civil War.

Medal of Honor citation
Rank and organization: Private, 34th New York Battery.
Place and date: Petersburg, Virginia., June 18, 1864.
Birth: France.
Date of issue: July 30, 1896

Citation:

As gunner of his piece, inflicted singly a great loss upon the enemy and distinguished himself in the removal of the piece while under a heavy fire.

See also
List of Medal of Honor recipients
List of American Civil War Medal of Honor recipients: G–L

References

External links

United States Army Medal of Honor recipients
United States Army soldiers
French emigrants to the United States
Foreign-born Medal of Honor recipients
1841 births
1913 deaths
American Civil War recipients of the Medal of Honor